The banknotes of the Sri Lanka rupee are part of the physical form of Sri Lanka's currency. The issuance of the rupee banknotes began in 1895.

The Government of Ceylon introduced its first paper money in the form of the 5 rupee banknote in 1895. These were followed by 10 rupee notes in 1894, 1000 rupee  notes in 1899, 50 rupee notes in 1914, 1 and 2 rupee notes in 1917 and 100 and 500 rupee notes in 1926. In 1942, emergency issues for 5, 10, 25 and 50 cents were introduced and issued until 1949.

In 1951, the Central Bank of Ceylon took over the issuance of paper money, introducing 1 and 10 rupee notes. These were followed in 1952 by 2, 5, 50 and 100 rupee notes. The 1 rupee notes were replaced by coins in 1963.

From 1977, banknotes were issued by the Central Bank of Sri Lanka. 20 rupees notes were introduced in 1979, followed by 500 and 1000 rupees in 1981, 200 rupees in 1998 and 2000 rupees in 2006. Sri Lankan banknotes are unusual in that they are printed vertically on the reverse. In 1998, a 200-rupee note was issued to commemorate the 50th anniversary of independence (1948–1998). This is the first polymer banknote issued in Sri Lanka, and it was printed by Note Printing Australia. All other denominations are printed by the De la Rue Lanka Currency and Securities Print (Pvt) Ltd, a joint venture of the Government of Sri Lanka and De La Rue, a printing company in the United Kingdom.

Banknotes

Private Banks

Verenigde Oostindische Compagnie (United East India Company)

Bank of Ceylon

Asiatic Banking Corporation

Chartered Mercantile Bank of India, London & China, Colombo / Galley / Kandy

Oriental Bank Corporation, Badulla / Colombo / Galley / Jaffna / Kandy / Newera Ellia

Government of Ceylon

Government of Ceylon series, 1885's 

Government of Ceylon 2nd series, 1930s

Government of Ceylon 2nd series, 1930s

King George VI series, 1940s

Central Bank Of Sri Lanka

King George VI 2nd series, 1951

Queen Elizabeth II series, 1952

Armorial Ensign of Ceylon series, 1956

S. W. R. D. Bandaranaike Portrait series, 1962

King Parakramabahu Series, 1965

S. W. R. D. Bandaranaike 2nd Series, 1970

S. W. R. D. Bandaranaike 3rd Series, 1971

Armorial Ensign of Sri Lanka series, 1975

Fauna and Flora Series, 1979

Historical and Archaeological series, 1981

Historical and Development series, 1987

Sri Lanka Heritage series, 1991, 2005
The Heritage Series saw many revisions throughout its life since 1991 up to 2010. The 1995 revision had an enhanced latent image at the center bottom of obverse sides. The 2001 revision added wider metallic strip to the 500 and 1000 rupee notes.

Development, Prosperity and Sri Lanka Dancers series, 2010
To celebrate its 60th anniversary, the Central Bank of Sri Lanka issued a new series of banknotes on 4 February 2011. The series was designed by two Sri Lankan artists selected from an island-wide competition. The themes of the new notes are Development and Prosperity, and Sri Lankan Dancers. The fronts of the new notes bear artistic impressions of selected development projects in Sri Lanka and native birds and butterflies. The backs depict Sri Lankan traditional dancers and guard stones in a background of a map of Sri Lanka. This new family does not include a 10-rupee note because that denomination was replaced by a coin on 5 April 2010.

 On 5 April 2010 Sri Lanka replaced the 10 rupee note with a coin.

Commemorative notes

The Central Bank of Sri Lanka has issued three commemorative notes in recognition of significant events of national importance. In 1998 a 200 rupee note was issued on Independence day to commemorate the 50th Independence Anniversary of the country. In 2009 a 1000 rupee note was issued commemorating the end of the Sri Lankan Civil War and the Ushering of Peace and Prosperity. In 2013 a 500 rupee note was issued for Commonwealth Heads of Government Meeting 2013 held in Sri Lanka.

See also
 Coins of the Sri Lankan rupee

References

External links

 Currency Museum - Central Bank of Sri Lanka
 Ceylon/Sri Lanka Banknotes - lakdiva.org
 Banknote World
Sri Lanka and Ceylon Banknotes
History of Currency in Sri Lanka